Little Jimmy's Italian Ices is a family-owned Italian ice manufacturing firm headquartered in Iselin, New Jersey. Pushcart owners around the country purchase Little Jimmy's Italian Ices from the ten-employee firm, running their carts as independent businesses.

History
Soon after emigrating from Sicily in 1932, Albert Mauro began making granita in his new home of Elizabeth, New Jersey. Working with one machine in his home, Mauro made the dessert from his family recipe and loaded up his truck.  He drove the streets of Elizabeth and Linden, New Jersey and parked outside the General Motors plant at the beginning and end of every shift.  Eventually, Mauro added three more trucks and two more machines.

In 2005, Little Jimmy's began offering its products nationwide as an Italian ice concession business, selling in some 35 states.

In 2014, Little Jimmy's was purchased by Maglione's Italian Ice of Iselin, New Jersey. The Italian ice franchising continues under the Little Jimmy's name.

See also
 List of frozen dessert brands

References 

Brand name frozen desserts
Italian-American culture in New Jersey
Food and drink companies established in 1932
1932 establishments in New Jersey
2014 mergers and acquisitions